Patu Keswani (born 9 February 1959 in Lucknow) is the chairman and managing director of Lemon Tree Hotels.

Early life and education 
Patu Keswani completed his education at St. Columba’s School, New Delhi. He received his bachelor's degree in Electrical Engineering from Indian Institute of Technology Delhi in 1981 and subsequently his Post Graduate Diploma in Business Management from Indian Institute of Management Calcutta 1983.

Career 
Keswani joined the TATA Administrative Service (TAS) in 1983 and worked with the TATA Group for over 15 years. His last assignment was as senior vice president and chief operating officer of the Taj Group of Hotels. In mid 2000, he joined management consulting firm, A.T. Kearney Inc. as a director in their New Delhi office. 

Keswani promoted Lemon Tree Hotels in 2002 and is the Chairman and Managing Director of the company, which owns and operates 84 hotels in 52 cities with 8,300 rooms and over 8,000 employees (as of April 2020). Lemon Tree Hotels listed on the National Stock Exchange of India on April 9. 
 
Keswani has focused on offering opportunities to Indians with disabilities. 20% of Lemon Tree employees (1000+ people) are from this disadvantaged segment of the population. Lemon Tree Hotels has been presented the National Award by the President of India for ‘Best Employer of Persons with Disabilities’ in 2016 and 2011 and a third National Award in 2012 for being a ‘Role Model in providing a Barrie-Free Environment to Persons with Disabilities.' 

Keswani is also the Chairman of the Skills Council for Persons with Disability (SCPwD). He is also a member of the Sector Skills Council for Hospitality, Travel and Tourism (NSDC) and the Sector Mentor Council for the Hospitality, Travel and Tourism Industry (Ministry of Labor and Employment). Keswani was, until recently, also a member of the University Grants Commission and a member of the Board of Governors of IIT Delhi.

Keswani's father was an Indian Railway Service officer and his mother a doctor in the Indian Army. He was previously married to Sharanita. They have two children, a son, Aditya ,and a daughter, Nayana. Keswani lives in New Delhi.

Awards 
Keswani has been awarded the Distinguished Alumni Award by his Alma Maters - IIT Delhi in 2011 and IIM Calcutta in 2012. 

Keswani was inducted into the FHRAI (Federation of Hotel and Restaurant Associations of India) Hall of Fame in 2010 and into the "Hotelier India" Hall of Fame in 2012.

The Lemon Tree Hotels were ranked 12th amongst the best large workplaces in Asia by the Great Place To Work Survey of 2018.

In June 2022, he was recognized by the International Hospitality Institute as one of the 100 Most Powerful People in Global Hospitality.

References

1959 births
Living people
Indian hoteliers
Businesspeople from Lucknow